Mallow GAA is a Gaelic football and hurling club based in the town of Mallow, Cork, Ireland. The club plays in Cork GAA competitions, and is part of the Avondhu divisional board.

Roll of honour
 Cork Senior Hurling Championship Runners-Up 1928
 Cork Senior A Football Championship Winners (1) 2021
 Cork Premier Intermediate Football Championship Winners (2) 2007, 2017
 Cork Intermediate Hurling Championship Winners (3) 1923, 1959, 1972  Runners-Up 1916, 1918, 1955, 1979, 1980, 1987, 2001
 Cork Intermediate Football Championship Winners (1)  1992 Runners-Up 1924, 1989
 Cork Junior Hurling Championship Winners (1) 1914 Runners-Up 1950
 Cork Minor Hurling Championship Runners-Up 1950, 1992, 2006, 2012
 Cork Minor Football Championship Runners-Up 1909, 1984, 1997
 Cork Minor A Football Championship Winners (2) 2007, 2021
 North Cork Under-19 Football Championship Winners (1) 2022
 Cork Under-21 Hurling Championship Runners-Up 1994
 Cork Under-21 Football Championship Winners (2) 1995, 2000 Runners-Up 1986, 1993, 1994
 North Cork Junior A Hurling Championship Winners 1926 Runners-Up 1938
 North Cork Junior A Football Championship Winners (3) 1929, 1933, 1984 Runners-Up 1932, 1935, 1941, 1942, 1948, 1954, 1956, 1957, 1971, 1972, 1987, 1995, 2005
 North Cork Under-21 Hurling Championship Winners (2) 2008, 2013
 North Cork Under-21 Football Championship Winners (2) 2014, 2021

Notable players

Willie Clancy
James Loughrey
Fergal McCormack
Ronan Sheehan
Matty Taylor

References

External links
Official Mallow GAA website

Gaelic games clubs in County Cork
Gaelic football clubs in County Cork
Hurling clubs in County Cork
Mallow, County Cork